In the most recent New Zealand census, in 2018, 70.2 per cent of the population identified as European and 16.5 per cent as Māori. Other major pan-ethnic groups include Asians (15.1 percent) and Pacific peoples (8.1 percent). Middle Eastern, Latin American and African ethnicities constitute a small remainder (1.5 percent) of the population. When completing the census people could select more than one ethnic group and this list includes all of the stated ethnic groups if more than one is chosen.

New Zealand's ethnic diversity can be attributed to its history and location. For example, the country's colonisation by Britain is a core reason for its Western values and culture.

Terminology 
The New Zealand census invites respondents to identify with an ethnic group.

There are six major ethnic groupings:
European New Zealanders (Pākehā) are a European ethnic group. It includes New Zealanders of European descent, European peoples (e.g. British, Dutch, German, Russian), and other peoples of indirect European descent (e.g. Americans, Canadians, South Africans and Australians).
Māori are the indigenous people of New Zealand.
Pacific peoples (Pasifika) originate from other islands in the Pacific, including from the Cook Islands, Niue, and Tokelau, all of which are dependent states of New Zealand.
Asian New Zealanders are a pan-ethnic group deriving from various nations in the Asian continent, such as Chinese, Indians or Filipinos, or their descendants.
 Middle Eastern, Latin American and African (MELAA) ethnicities constitute a very small remainder of the population.
"Other" is a grouping of ethnic groups which do not fit into the other five top-level ethnic groups.

Handling multiple ethnicities 
Many respondents identify with multiple ancestries. Outputting data on multiple ethnicities is normally handled one of two ways: total response or prioritised ethnicity. For this list, the total response method is used. 

Total response counts people of multiple ethnicities in each ethnic groups in which they identify. While this shows all the people that identify with a particular ethnicities, the sum of all ethnic group populations adds to more than the total population. For example, a person who identifies as New Zealand European and Māori would be counted twice, once under each ethnicity, under total response output. 

Prioritised ethnicity counts people with multiple ethnicities in the highest-priority single ethnic group in which they identify. The order of priority for ethnicity, from highest to lowest, is Māori, Pacific peoples, Asian, MELAA, Other, and European. While it has the advantage that the sum of all ethnic groups equals the total population, the preferential order can cause ethnic groups to be overrepresented or underrepresented, and may categorise a person differently from their self-identified primary ethnicity. For example, a person who identifies as New Zealand European and Māori would be counted under the Māori ethnic group under prioritised ethnicity output.

Ethnicities
Ethnicities (self-identified) recorded in the 2006 and 2013 New Zealand censuses. Only ethnicities with 1,000 or more responses at the 2013 census are included individually:

nfd - Not Further Defined (insufficient data to classify the response further)
nec - Not Elsewhere Classified (when no category exists for the response)
a - Includes Don't Know, Refused to Answer, Response Unidentifiable, Response Outside Scope and Not Stated
MELAA - Middle Eastern, Latin American and African

Ethnic groups by region

In images

See also
 Demographics of New Zealand

Citations

References

 
Lists
Ethnic Origins
Ethnic